James Peach (born 14 June 1997 in Doncaster) is an English professional squash player. As of November 2021, he was ranked number 269 in the world.

References

1997 births
Living people
English male squash players